Final Fight is a series of beat 'em up video games by Capcom, which began with the arcade release of Final Fight in 1989. Set in the fictional Metro City, the games focus on a group of heroic vigilantes who fight against the control and various threats of criminal gangs, primarily the Mad Gear Gang. The series has sold 3.2 million units worldwide as of December 31, 2019.

Video games

Final Fight series
The original Final Fight was directed by Yoshiki Okamoto, and released on arcades. It was followed by two sequels for the SNES: Final Fight 2 in 1993 and Final Fight 3 (Final Fight Tough in Japan) in 1995. The sequels were produced specifically for the home console market by Capcom's consumer division (led by Tokuro Fujiwara) with no preceding arcade versions. The original Final Fight for the SNES included the playable characters Haggar and Cody but did not include Guy, and also omitted the two-player feature; an updated 1992 release, Final Fight Guy, included Guy but not Cody, but still lacked the two-player feature. A parody of the original game, titled Mighty Final Fight, was released for the NES and featured childlike "super deformed" or "chibi" versions of the original Final Fight characters. A competitive 3-D fighting game spinoff, Final Fight Revenge, was released for Sega's Titan arcade hardware in 1999, which was followed by a home version for the Sega Saturn in Japan only. A 3D sequel titled Final Fight: Streetwise was released in 2006 for the PlayStation 2 and Xbox. A compilation called Final Fight: Double Impact which bundles the original Final Fight with Magic Sword released in 2010.

Other games
The video game Captain Commando is set in a future version of Metro City. Several Final Fight characters re-emerged as playable characters in later Street Fighter games and other competitive fighting games by Capcom: Guy and Sodom appeared in Street Fighter Alpha in 1995, followed by Rolento in Street Fighter Alpha 2 in 1996 and Cody in Street Fighter Alpha 3 in 1998. Guy's theme is a remix of the music from the opening stage of Final Fight, while his stage in Street Fighter Alpha 2 features several cameos of characters from Final Fight, such as Cody, Haggar, and some enemy characters. Andore would make a reappearance as a playable character in Street Fighter III 2nd Impact under the name Hugo in 1997. He is accompanied by Poison as his manager. Both would reappear in SNK vs. Capcom: SVC Chaos 2003, which also features the cameo appearances of the first two Final Fight bosses, Damnd and Sodom, in Chun-Li's ending. Both Cody and Guy are playable characters in Super Street Fighter IV while Hugo is in a cameo in a stage and a large statue of Mike Haggar also appear in the game as well, released in 2010. Cody's musical theme is a remix of the intro music from Final Fight. There is also a downloadable Mike Haggar outfit for Zangief in Street Fighter IV. Rolento was considered as a playable character for Super Street Fighter IV, but was edged out by Adon as he had slightly more interest. He later appeared in Ultra Street Fighter IV, alongside Hugo and Poison. However, the construction site from his boss battle features as one of the stages. The car-vandalizing bonus stage was later used in early versions of Street Fighter II. In Super Street Fighter IV, if Cody or Guy are vandalizing the car in the bonus stage, Mad Gear member Bred will appear and complain, in the same way as he does in Final Fight. Abigail, Cody, Lucia and Poison appear as playable characters via DLC in Street Fighter V.

The character Mike Haggar is featured as a wrestler in Saturday Night Slam Masters and its two sequels, Muscle Bomber Duo and Slam Masters II: Ring of Destruction with his daughter Jessica appearing alongside him. Guy is a playable character in Capcom Fighting Jam while Cody, Haggar, Jessica, Hugo, and Sodom appear in the game as cameo characters. Both Guy and Mike Haggar are playable characters in the Namco-published crossover game, Namco x Capcom, which was released for the PlayStation 2 in Japan only. In it, Guy is paired with Sho, a.k.a. Ginzu the Ninja from Captain Commando. Mike Haggar is a playable character in Marvel vs. Capcom 3: Fate of Two Worlds, where he was the first character from the Final Fight series to be featured in the Marvel vs. Capcom series. In the game, there is also a stage that takes place in Metro City with the Mad Gear gang fighting the police in the background. Haggar returns in the game's sequel, Marvel vs. Capcom: Infinite, where he is now the mayor of New Metro City, a fusion of Metro City and Marvel's New York City. Hugo, Poison, Cody, Guy, and Rolento are playable characters in Street Fighter X Tekken. Mike Haggar and several Mad Gear bosses can be also seen in cameo appearance in this game at the background named "Mad Gear Hideout". Maki Genryusai is the only original character from Final Fight 2 to make a return appearance (Carlos, on the other hand, would make only a cameo appearance in Alex's ending in Capcom Fighting Evolution). She made her second video game appearance in the 2001 fighting game Capcom vs. SNK 2, using many of the same techniques from Final Fight 2 as part of her move-set. Maki has also been featured as a trading card in Card Fighters 2 and Card Fighter DS. The Capcom vs. SNK 2 version of her character was also featured in the portable versions of Street Fighter Alpha 3 released for the Game Boy Advance and PlayStation Portable.

Characters

Street Fighters
Mike Haggar - the Mayor of Metro City, a former professional wrestler, and father of Jessica. He has slicked back brown hair and a mustache. His primary outfit consists of green trousers, held up with a brown diagonal belt shoulder strap, and brown dress shoes.
Cody Travers - an experienced brawler, often training with his best friend Guy. He is also Jessica's boyfriend. He has blonde hair and his primary outfit is a white T-shirt with blue jeans and white sneakers (later becomes a loose white and blue striped uniform with white Adidas shell-toe shoes).
Guy - An American ninja of Japanese ancestry, who is Cody's sparring partner, and a friend of both Cody and Jessica. He has brown hair and his primary outfit is a red with yellow shinobi shozoku, and various red and white casual athletic shoes (i.e. modeled after Vans skateboarding shoes, Chuck Taylor Allstars, etc.; though were originally simple tabi shoes or boots).
Maki Genryusai - A younger sister of Guy's fiancée. Like Guy, Maki is also trained in the Bushin style of ninjutsu and uses many of the same abilities and techniques. In her original Japanese backstory, Maki is a fierce ex-leader of a youth motorcycle gang, but this was censored in the English version of the game.
Carlos Miyamoto - Carlos grew up in South America studying different types of martial arts. He moved to Metro City to finish his studies and stayed with Mike Haggar for a period of time. Although Carlos had mastered many styles of fighting, he prefers to use his katana to slice and dice his enemies. He has an appearance that resembles T. Hawk from Street Fighter, and is armed with a samurai sword.
Lucia Morgan - A young and petite female detective in the SCU (Special Crimes Unit) from within the Metro City Police Department, Lucia interrupts Haggar as he's talking with Guy, informing them both that the city is under attack and from there, Lucia, who wishes to repay Haggar back with a personal act of kind gratitude due to the fact that he had previously cleared her of a false corruption charge joins forces with him, Guy, and a mysterious street fighter named Dean in order to fight against and defeat the Skull Cross Gang, who had established themselves as the new dominant criminal organization of Metro City following the downfall and destruction of the Mad Gear Gang. Lucia has very long, slender, muscular legs and short, blonde hair. She stands at an above-average height, having a toned physique and wears a fighting police outfit consisting of a blue sports bra with a brown under-cut vest and fingerless gloves, denim shorts, and tennis shoes. 
Dean - When the Skull Cross Gang terrorizes the city in place of the now defunct Mad Gear Gang, Dean was one of the people they wanted in their group. While having extensive knowledge of the gang, Dean declined their offer. Stray and the gang maliciously murders his family and the grief-stricken Dean now seeks to avenge their deaths. He carries a picture of his family wherever he goes. Dean is a towering, muscular fellow with tall, spiky, blond hair. He wears a white sleeveless T-shirt with black pants, headband, harness, wristbands, and boots.

In other media
The American Street Fighter animated series featured an episode based on Final Fight and titled after the game, which aired during the shows second season. Adapting the plot of the game, the "Final Fight" episode centered on Cody and Guy teaming up with leading Street Fighter characters Ryu and Ken to rescue Jessica from the Mad Gear Gang. Although, Guy and Cody were both characters in the Street Fighter series, the episode actually predates Cody's first appearance in the series as a playable character in Street Fighter Alpha 3 and depicts him in his character design from Final Fight. The episode is included as unlockable content in Final Fight: Double Impact. An episode of the 1991 Nickelodeon hidden camera show What Would You Do? featured a Final Fight kiosk which distracted kids by mentioning personal information about them.

Maki Genryusai appears in 1996 manga Sakura Ganbaru! as one of several rivals the titular character Sakura Kasugano (from Street Fighter Alpha 2) encounters. The Street Fighter II Turbo comic book by UDON Entertainment features a supplemental story arc spanning issues 6 and 7 centering on the Final Fight characters who were featured in the Street Fighter series.

Reception
The actor Robin Williams stated that he named his son Cody Williams after a video game character, which is believed to be Cody from Final Fight. In 2010, Game Informer included it on the list of ten gaming franchises that should be revived, adding: "It's one of many sidescrolling beat-em-ups we'd love to see return, but it's also one of the best."

References

External links
 
 Final Fight series at MobyGames

 
Capcom beat 'em ups
Capcom franchises
Organized crime video games
Video game franchises
Video game franchises introduced in 1989
Video games about ninja